The second election to South Glamorgan County Council and was held in May 1977. It was preceded by the 1973 election and followed by the 1981 election.

Boundary changes
There were no boundary changes but the balance of representation in the Penarth wards appears to have changed with the North/Central ward gaining a seat and the West ward losing one.

Candidates
Conservative and Labour candidates contested the vast majority of seats. In contrast with four years previously there were more Liberal candidates together with a smaller number of Plaid Cymru candidates and Independents.

Outcome
When the authority was established the Conservatives had hoped to win control but failed to do so in 1973. However, they won control at this election, with sweeping gains across Cardiff and the Vale, including some seats which the party had not fully contested at the previous election. Defeated candidates included the leader of the council, Jack Leonard.

Ward Results

Adamsdown (two seats)

Barry, Baruc (one seat)

Barry, Buttrills (one seat)

Barry, Cadoc (one seat)

Barry, Castleland (one seat)

Barry, Court (two seats)

Barry, Dyfan (two seats)

Barry, Illtyd (one seat)
Councillor Tresize had sat for the Cadoc Ward at the previous election.

Canton (two seats)

Cardiff Rural No.1 (one seat)

Cardiff Rural No.3, Dinas Powys (two seats)

Cardiff Rural No.4, Wenvoe (one seat)

Cardiff Rural No.5, Rhoose (one seat)

Cardiff South (two seats)

Cathays (three seats)

Central (two seats)

Cowbridge No.1 (one seat)

Cowbridge No.2 (two seats)

Ely (four seats)

Gabalfa (three seats)

Grangetown (two seats)

Lisvane, Llanedeyrn and St Mellons (one seat)

Llandaff (three seats)

Llanishen (four seats)

Penarth North/Central (one seats)

Penarth South Ward (two seats)

Penarth West (one seat)

Penylan (five seats)

Plas Mawr (four seats)

Plasnewydd (two seats)

Rhiwbina (three seats)

Riverside (two seats)

Roath (three seats)

Rumney (five seats)

Splott (three seats)

Whitchurch (three seats)

 

KEY

 indicates sitting councillor for the ward
 
+ indicates sitting councillor but for different ward

References

1977 Welsh local elections
South Glamorgan County Council elections